The following games were initially announced as Game Boy titles, however were subsequently cancelled or postponed indefinitely by developers or publishers.

References

 
Game Boy games
Game Boy